The 2007 Men's NORCECA Volleyball Championship was the 20th edition of the Men's Continental Volleyball Tournament, played by eight countries from September 16 to September 21, 2007 in the Anaheim Convention Center in Anaheim, United States.

Competing nations

Squads

Preliminary round

Group A

Sunday September 16

Monday September 17

Tuesday September 18

Group B

Sunday September 16

Monday September 17

Tuesday September 18

Final round

Quarter-finals
Wednesday 2007-09-19

Semi-finals
Thursday 2007-09-20 — 5th/8th place

Thursday 2007-09-20 — 1st/4th place

Finals
Friday 2007-09-21 — Seventh Place Match

Friday 2007-09-21 — Fifth Place Match

Friday 2007-09-21 — Bronze Medal Match

Friday 2007-09-21 — Gold Medal Match

Final ranking

USA and Puerto Rico qualified for the 2007 FIVB Men's World Cup

Awards

Most Valuable Player
  Lloy Ball

Best Scorer
  Héctor Soto

Best Spiker
  Victor Rivera

Best Blocker
  Murray Grapentine

Best Server
  Clay Stanley

Best Digger
  Chris Wolfenden

Best Setter
  Lloy Ball

Best Receiver
  Elvis Contreras

Best Libero
  Amaury Martínez

Best Coach ("Jim E. Coleman Award")
  Hugh McCutcheon

References
Results

Men's NORCECA Volleyball Championship
N
N
Volleyball
Volleyball in California
Volley